TGG may refer to:

 Rugby league football, sometimes referred to as The Greatest Game, shortened to "TGG"
 Sultan Mahmud Airport, airport serving Kuala Terengganu, with IATA code: TGG
 Terbium gallium garnet, a chemical compound whose crystals have a high Verdet constant
 TGG Group, an American management consulting holding company
 The Golden Girls, television comedy
 The Good Guys (Australasia), chain of consumer electronics retail stores in Australia and New Zealand
 The Gores Group, a private equity firm
 The Great Gatsby, novel by the American author F. Scott Fitzgerald
 The Greatest Generation (podcast), Star Trek podcast
 The Guy Game, adult video game for the PlayStation 2 and Xbox
 Transformational-generative grammar, generative grammar developed in the Chomskyan tradition
 Tryptophan, written as TGG in the DNA codon table